John Doukas, Latinized as Ducas is the name of several Byzantine aristocrats and their descendants. It may refer to any of the following:

 John Doukas (Caesar), brother of Emperor Constantine X Doukas
 John Doukas (megas doux) ( – before 1136), brother-in-law of Alexios I Komnenos
 John Doukas (megas hetaireiarches), military commander and diplomat
 John Doukas (sebastokrator), cousin of Emperors Isaac II Angelos and Alexios III Angelos
 John Doukas Komnenos (1128–1176)
 John III Doukas Vatatzes (1193–1254), Emperor of Nicaea 1222–1254
 John Komnenos Doukas, ruler of Thessalonica and Thessaly 1237–1244
 John Doukas (son of Michael II), son of Michael II of Epirus, hostage in Constantinople
 John I Doukas of Thessaly, ruler of Thessaly 1268–1289
 John II Doukas of Thessaly, ruler of Thessaly 1303–1318
 John II Orsini (also called Doukas), ruler of Epirus 1323–1335
 John Uroš, ruler of Thessaly 1370–1373